Maurolicus breviculus is a species of ray-finned fish in the genus Maurolicus. It lives in deep-water environments off the coast of Ecuador and the Galapagos Islands.

References 

Fish described in 1993
Sternoptychidae